Joseph S. "Joe" Tropila is a Democratic Party member of the Montana Senate, representing District 12 since 2002. Earlier he was a member of the Montana House of Representatives from 1975 through 1980, and from 1994 through 2002.

External links
Montana Senate - Joseph Tropila official MT State Legislature website
Project Vote Smart - Senator Joseph S. Tropila (MT) profile
Follow the Money - Joseph Tropila
2008 2006 2002 Senate campaign contributions
2000 1998 1996 1994 House campaign contributions

Democratic Party Montana state senators
Democratic Party members of the Montana House of Representatives
University of Providence alumni
1935 births
Living people
Politicians from Jersey City, New Jersey
Politicians from Great Falls, Montana